Victor Patrick Carton (6 January 1902 – 11 April 1970) was an Irish Fine Gael politician. He was a member of Seanad Éireann from 1954 to 1969. He was first elected to the 8th Seanad in 1954 by the Labour Panel, and was re-elected at the 1957, 1961 and 1965 elections. He did not contest the 1969 Seanad election.

He stood for election to Dáil Éireann on four occasions but was not elected.

References

1902 births
1970 deaths
Members of the 8th Seanad
Members of the 9th Seanad
Members of the 10th Seanad
Members of the 11th Seanad
Fine Gael senators
Politicians from County Dublin